Parliamentary elections were held in the Kingdom of Serbs, Croats and Slovenes on 11 September 1927. The People's Radical Party remained the largest faction in Parliament, winning 112 of the 315 seats.

Results

Ethnic breakdown
The members of parliament had the following ethnic makeup:

Elected representatives

S. Barić - Croatian Popular Party
Đuro Basariček - Croatian Peasant Party
Sekula Drljević - Montenegrin Federalist Party
Anton Korošec - Slovene People's Party
Filip Markotić - Croatian Peasant Party 
Ante Pavelić - Croatian Bloc
Ivan Pernar - Croatian Peasant Party
Puniša Račić - People's Radical Party
Stjepan Radić - Croatian Peasant Party
Milan Stojadinović - People's Radical Party
Ante Trumbić - Croatian Bloc

References

External links
Nebojša A. Popović Srpske parlamentarne stranke u Kraljevini SHS 1918-1929

Yugoslavia
Parliamentary election
Elections in Yugoslavia
Yugoslavia parliamentary election
Election and referendum articles with incomplete results